Masjid al-Faruq is a Sunni mosque located in Nørrebro, Copenhagen, associated with Hizb ut-Tahrir.

Controversies
Omar el-Hussein attended the mosque the day before perpetrating the 2015 Copenhagen shootings. The sermon that day included references to Muhammed waging war against Jews, and accused Western civilization of leading non-Muslims to corruption.

In July 2018, Mundhir Abdallah, a Hizb ut-Tahrir member, delivered a sermon including the quote:

For this, he was charged with §266(b) and §136 part 3 of the penal code (respectively nicknamed racismeparagraffen and forkynderloven), the latter of which prohibits religious teachers from including express approval of certain crimes, including manslaughter, in religious instruction. The defense argued that Abdallah should be acquitted because the sermon was based on a Hadithic quote, because it was meant to refer to Israel rather than Jews in general, and because it was meant as a "prophecy" rather than an encouragement. He was found guilty on both charges.

On 4 October 2018, 6 politicians from the Danish People's Party made a proposal to outlaw the mosque, but the motion did not carry. In December 2018, Minister of Justice Søren Pape Poulsen reported that the Ministry of Justice did not find a basis for this action in the constitution:

On 21 June 2019, imam Mundhir Abdallah stated in a sermon that the rulers and heads of state of Muslim countries, such as Iran, UAE, and Saudi Arabia, were serving crusader countries (United States), and that Jerusalem was occupied by Zionists.

References

Faruq Mosque
Islamism in Denmark
Hizb ut-Tahrir
Islam and antisemitism